The 2009 Oklahoma Sooners football team represented the University of Oklahoma in the 2009 NCAA Division I FBS football season, the 115th season of Sooner football. The team was led by two-time Walter Camp Coach of the Year Award winner, Bob Stoops, in his 11th season as head coach. They played their home games at Gaylord Family Oklahoma Memorial Stadium in Norman, Oklahoma. They were a charter member of the Big 12 Conference.

Conference play began with a win over the Baylor Bears at home on October 10, and ended with a win at home over the Oklahoma State Cowboys in the annual Bedlam Series on November 28. The Sooners finished the regular season with a 7–5 record (5–3 in the Big 12), their worst record since 1999, while finishing in a tie with Texas Tech for third in the Big 12 South. They were invited to the Sun Bowl, where they upset the Stanford Cardinal, 31–27.

Following the season, four members of the team were drafted in the first round of the 2010 NFL Draft: Sam Bradford at #1, Gerald McCoy at #3, Trent Williams at #4, and Jermaine Gresham at #21. Oklahoma thus became the first school in the history of the NFL Draft with three players selected in the top four picks. In addition to those four players, Keenan Clayton was selected in the 4th round, and Dominique Franks and Brody Eldridge were drafted in the 5th. This total number of seven ties with the total following the 2011 season as the second most Sooners selected in the NFL Draft in the 16 years of the Stoops era, placing behind the mark of 11 after the 2004 season.

Recruits

Schedule

Roster

Oklahoma listed 103 players on the roster with a breakdown of 21 seniors, 22 juniors, 22 sophomores, 14 redshirt freshmen, and 24 true freshmen. Sam Bradford, Brody Eldridge, Gerald McCoy and Ryan Reynolds served as team captains for the 2009 squad. During the course of the season, Oklahoma suffered many injuries. Many of those injuries were starters. Those that missed at least one game during the 2009 season include quarterback Sam Bradford (injured in game one, came back for game five but was reinjured in game 6 and missed the rest of the season), tight end Jermaine Gresham (injured before the start of the season), guards Brian Simmons (injured in game five and missed five games), Jarvis Jones and Brody Eldridge (both injured in game nine and out the rest of the season), wide receivers Ryan Broyles (injured in game four and missed one game) and Brandon Caleb, defensive end Auston English (injured in game nine and out the rest of the season), safety Quinton Carter, linebacker Tom Wort (injured before the season) and running back DeMarco Murray.

Game summaries

BYU (Cowboys Classic)

The Sooners opened the season on the road in the newly constructed Cowboys Stadium in Arlington, Texas against the 20th ranked program in the country. Going into the game, Oklahoma was 10–1 in season openers and 9–2 in road openers under Bob Stoops. This was only the second time these teams had faced each other, the first coming in the 1994 Copper Bowl when the #22 ranked Cougars threw for 485 yards and defeated the Sooners 31–6. The Cougars were led by four-year head coach Bronco Mendenhall, who was then 32-7 as the Cougars head coach. The Sooners, ranked number three in the preseason, were favored to win by a large margin with most estimates at around 21 points. BYU earned approximately $1.5 million for playing the Sooners, while the Sooners received $2.25 million for playing in Dallas.

Prior to the game, both teams experienced multiple personnel issues. On the BYU side, left tackle Matt Reynolds fractured a finger and was still questionable for the season opener. Starting guard Jason Speredon was out for the season with a torn rotator cuff. Freshman Houston Reynolds also experienced a season-ending injury when he tore his ACL. A few days prior to the game, Oklahoma All-American Jermaine Gresham suffered a season-ending knee injury. Oklahoma saw several issues develop in their linebacker corp. Freshman Tom Wort tore his ACL during practice and would end up missing the entire season. Senior Mike Balogun experienced legal issues when his eligibility was called into question and subsequently decertified to participate in the 2009 season by the NCAA. Balogun sued the NCAA and was granted a temporary restraining order so he could continue to practice. He missed the season opener after he was unable to quickly resolve the issue with the NCAA.

The Cougars controlled the ball for much of the game, maintaining possession for over 37 minutes. Oklahoma was the first to score on an 8-yard pass to sophomore WR Ryan Broyles with five minutes left in the first quarter. BYU had missed a 46-yard field goal in their prior possession. On BYU's last possession of the half, quarterback Max Hall completed a 49-yard pass to Bryan Kariya which left the Cougars 5 yards short of the end zone. Two plays later, Hall completed another pass for a touchdown to tie the game. On the Sooners next possession, and the last series before halftime, the Sooners began at their own 30-yard line. After completing his longest pass of the game, an 18-yard pass to Brandon Caleb, which broke the school record for most passing yards in a career, previously held by Jason White, Sam Bradford went down with a shoulder injury. He would miss the rest of the game. The Sooners managed a 35-yard field goal to go up 10–7 at the half.

The third quarter was quiet offensively. BYU reached midfield on their third possession of the quarter which marked the furthest progression of either team during the quarter. On BYU's last possession of the quarter, Hall threw his second interception of the game to Oklahoma linebacker Keenan Clayton, leaving Oklahoma within 25 yards from the end zone. Despite the short yardage, Oklahoma and redshirt freshman quarterback Landry Jones were unable to capitalize and settled for a field goal to extend their lead to 13–7. The next BYU possession proved tantamount for the Cougars. After beginning on their own 22-yard line, they drove down the field for 16 plays and scored a touchdown to go up 14–13. This included a fourth down conversion that resulted in a 23-yard gain. The Oklahoma defense held the BYU offense back for a while, forcing the Cougars to execute seven plays within the seven-yard line before finally succumbing. The BYU defense held Oklahoma on their next possession, securing the win.

Idaho State

Idaho State served as the 2009 home opener for the Oklahoma Sooners. The Bengals competed in the Big Sky Conference of the NCAA Division I-FCS. This was the third time Oklahoma had played a Division I FCS (previously I-AA) team under Bob Stoops. Oklahoma won the previous two matchups by a combined score of 106–2. This game had a similar result to the other two. With backup quarterback Landry Jones making his first start, Oklahoma won 64–0 for their 25th consecutive win at home, tying the school record.

Idaho State made an immediate impression on Oklahoma during the Sooner's first possession. With his first pass as a starter, Jones connected with wide receiver Ryan Broyles for a 34-yard gain. After a couple additional rushes and passes, Oklahoma found itself two yards shy of the end zone. After four plays, Oklahoma was unable to penetrate the end zone and turned the ball over to the Bengals. Unable to produce anything offensively, the Bengals turned the ball back over to Oklahoma a short time later. On their second possession of the quarter, Jones and Broyles again connected, this time for a 24-yard touchdown pass. Oklahoma would end the first quarter up 21–0 after the OU defense sacked the Idaho State quarterback, forcing a fumble, which was returned for a touchdown. Soon came another 51-yard touchdown pass from Jones to Broyles. Jones and Broyles connected for a third time in the opening possession of the second quarter with an 11-yard touchdown pass. After another fumble recovery for the Sooners near midfield, Oklahoma increased their lead to 34–0. Oklahoma added one more touchdown before halftime to go up 41–0. By halftime, Idaho State had accumulated negative-two yards of total offense.

Oklahoma added one touchdown in the third quarter. In the fourth quarter, Oklahoma added two more, one on a 36-yard rush by backup running back Jonathon Miller. Idaho State was never able to get anything going on offense and only crossed midfield once, to make it to Oklahoma's 49-yard line. They finished the game with 44 total yards, including negative 22 rushing yards. Oklahoma finished with 564 total yards which included 286 passing yards by Jones. Running back DeMarco Murray also finished the game with 101 rushing yards.

Tulsa

In a continuation of the instate series, Oklahoma hosted the Tulsa Golden Hurricane for the third game of the season. The two teams first faced each other in 1914 with the Sooners leading the series 15-7-1. Since 1979, when the series was renewed following a 36-year hiatus, the Sooners were 9–1. Tulsa came into the game as the NCAA-leader in total offense in the prior two seasons, and they had averaged 450 yards of total offense in their first two games of the 2009 season.

The Sooners began the game by throwing an interception on the opening play. Tulsa was unable to move the ball and went three-and-out. Oklahoma took possession and managed to progress to Tulsa's five-yard line, but, due to penalties, lost yardage and had to settle for a field goal. Tulsa then started their drive and managed to progress to Oklahoma's 12-yard line. However, Tulsa quarterback G. J. Kinne's pass was intercepted in the end zone. Starting at their own two-yard line, Oklahoma was unable to progress and was forced to punt the ball back to Tulsa who subsequently missed a 50-yard field goal. Oklahoma ended the first quarter with a touchdown pass from QB Landry Jones to wide receiver Brandon Caleb. Tulsa opened the second quarter with a drive that led them back to the Oklahoma 12-yard line, where Oklahoma defensive players promptly forced a fumble, and recovered. Oklahoma scored quickly with a 63-yard touchdown pass to Caleb on the second play of the drive. Oklahoma scored two more touchdowns in the second quarter to go up 31–0 at halftime.

The second half again saw no touchdowns for the Tulsa offense. Twice Tulsa attempted to convert on a fourth down, but failed both times. The closest Tulsa progressed to the Oklahoma end zone in the second half was the Sooner's 27-yard line. Oklahoma, however, added two touchdowns in the second half. Oklahoma quarterback Landry Jones, in his second start, set a school record with six touchdown passes in a game. The previous record of five touchdown passes in a game was held by three Sooners: Jones's quarterback coach and Heisman Trophy runner-up Josh Heupel and Heisman Trophy-winners Jason White and Sam Bradford. Jones was later named the AT&T ESPN All-American National Player of the Week. This game also marked the second straight shutout by the Sooners, the first time since 1987. Oklahoma also extended their school record of consecutive wins at home to 26. Oklahoma finished the game with 529 yards of total offense and Tulsa with 269.

Miami (FL)

Following the bye week, Oklahoma traveled to Miami Gardens, Florida to play Miami. This was the final game in a two-game series that began in 2007 when the Hurricanes visited Norman, where the Sooners soundly defeated them 51-13 after Sam Bradford threw five touchdown passes and the Sooner defense limited them to 139 total yards.

The Oklahoma defense came into the game without letting a score for 123 minutes after posting back-to-back shutouts. Oklahoma was the fourth consecutive ranked opponent Miami had faced, opening 2–1 after defeating Florida State and Georgia Tech but losing to Virginia Tech in the week prior to Oklahoma. Much of the pre-game hype had surrounded whether Oklahoma starting quarterback Sam Bradford would return after suffering an injury in the season opener. On the Thursday prior to the game, it was decided that freshman Landry Jones would make his third start against Miami. Going into the game, Oklahoma was a seven-point favorite.

Oklahoma scored first after Dominique Franks intercepted a pass from Jacory Harris, the Miami quarterback, on the Oklahoma 4-yard line. Oklahoma drove the length of the field and Jones connected with received Cameron Kenney for a 16-yard touchdown. Miami's next possession ended the same way when Brian Jackson intercepted another Harris pass on the Oklahoma 7-yard line. Early in the second quarter, Oklahoma made its way to the Miami 4-yard line but was unable to score a touchdown and instead settled for a field goal to give them a 10–0 lead. Miami answered on the next possession. Following a fumble that Miami was able to regain, Harris completed an 18-yard pass to Jimmy Graham for a touchdown to bring the score to 10–7, with Oklahoma still on top.

Oklahoma got the ball to begin the second half but immediately turned it over after the Miami defense sacked Jones and forced a fumble at the Oklahoma 11-yard line. Miami recovered it and quickly converted it to a touchdown, taking the lead by a score of 14–10. Oklahoma was not able to answer and instead incurred two personal foul penalties forcing them into a fourth down with 42 yards to go. Miami took possession after the punt and capitalized with a third touchdown giving them an 11-point lead. Trying to prevent the game from getting out of hand, Oklahoma marched down the field after plays that included a 19-yard rush from Chris Brown, a 25-yard pass to Cameron Kenney, and a 21-yard pass to DeMarco Murray to score a touchdown to decrease the deficit to four. The score would remain unchanged until Oklahoma scored a field goal near the end of the fourth quarter on a drive that saw six consecutive running plays and one pass that gained no yards. Miami took possession of the ball with just over four minutes remaining in the game and were able to hold that possession until time expired giving them a one-point win.

Miami not only won by just one point, but they also shared similar statistics with Oklahoma. Both managed 21 first down, and while Miami managed 342 yards of total offense, Oklahoma had 341. Miami won the passing battle with 202 yards to Oklahoma's 188. Oklahoma won the ground game with 153 yards to Miami's 140. During the game, the Sooners leading wide receiver, Ryan Broyles, suffered a broken shoulder blade. It would later be determined he would miss up to six weeks because of the injury.

Baylor

Oklahoma returned home to take on the Baylor Bears following their loss to Miami. Entering the game, Oklahoma was a perfect 18–0 against the Bears and had outscored them by an average of 43–12. Baylor had lost 18 consecutive games against top 25 opponents. For the second week in a row, much of the pre-game talk had been on whether Oklahoma quarterback Sam Bradford would return following an injury sustained in the first game of the season. That talk ended the day before the game when it was announced Bradford would make an appearance in the game against Baylor. Baylor was without their starting quartback, Robert Griffin III, who suffered a season ending knee injury earlier in the season, and their backup quarterback, Blake Szymanski, who had a shoulder injury but still played late in the game. This forced Baylor to rely on their third-string quarterback, freshman Nick Florence.

Baylor controlled the ball for most of the first half, gaining a total of 166 yards. However, it was a pair of touchdown runs by Oklahoma's Chris Brown, both in the second quarter, that put the Sooners up 14–7 at halftime. Baylor's points came during a drive that started on their own 41-yard line and included a 43-yard pass that put them in the red zone. In the second half, Oklahoma's offense failed to capitalize in the red zone on several occasions. The Oklahoma offense progressed to inside the Baylor 20-yard line four times but was forced to settle for a field goal each time. Oklahoma's kicker Jimmy Stevens was 4-for-4, making field goals of 35, 25, 21, and 24 yards. Oklahoma did not score a touchdown in the second half until within the five-minute mark to put them up 33–7. Baylor went three-and-out in their next possession and Oklahoma ran out the clock to end the game.

In his first game back, Bradford completed 27 of his 49 pass attempts for 389 yards. Head coach Bob Stoops was disappointed that his receivers dropped eleven balls, including at least five that were "dead right in their hands." DeMarco Murray finished with 113 yards on 24 carries to lead the Oklahoma ground game to a total of 203 yards. The Oklahoma offense ended the day with a season-high 592 total yards to Baylor's 268. Florence managed 220 yards in the air on 41 attempts while the original back up, Szymanski, completed one of his two pass attempts for 42 yards. Baylor's ground game only netted 6 yards.

Texas (Red River Rivalry)

This game marked the 104th meeting of the Red River Rivalry, which has been called one of the greatest sports rivalries. Since 1929, the game has been held at the Cotton Bowl in Dallas, Texas typically in mid-October with the State Fair of Texas occurring adjacent to the stadium. Going into the 2009 match, Texas led the series 58–40–5, but Oklahoma coach Bob Stoops was 6–4 against Texas. Texas came into the game undefeated, ranked number 3, and with two Heisman contenders: quarterback Colt McCoy and receiver Jordan Shipley. They were also the highest scoring team in the FBS up to that point. However, Texas also had injury concerns going into the game. Before the game, it was unclear if running backs Tre' Newton and Vondrell McGee would play (McGee would later get one carry during the game). On the Oklahoma side, offensive guard Brian Simmons was injured during the Baylor game and would miss the game, while WR Ryan Broyles, who was injured during the Miami game and was originally thought to be out four to six weeks, would make an early reentry and start in the Texas game.

Oklahoma's issues in the red zone continued into the Red River Rivalry. During the first possession of the game, Oklahoma drove from their own 14-yard line to the Texas nine primarily on a 64-yard pass from QB Sam Bradford to RB DeMarco Murray but was unable to capitalize with a touchdown on three attempts and had to settle for a field goal giving them the early lead, 3–0. On the ensuing Texas possession, the Oklahoma defense sacked McCoy, forcing a fumble, which was picked up by linebacker Ryan Reynolds. After the fumble recovery, the Texas defense followed up with a sack on Bradford. During the sack, Bradford fell on the same shoulder that he injured in the season opener, re-injuring it, and taking him out for the rest of the game. Oklahoma backup quarterback Landry Jones entered the game. Oklahoma went three-and-out, as did Texas on their next possession. After a couple passes from Jones to Brandon Caleb and Cameron Kenney, Oklahoma was again inside the Texas 20-yard line, where they again settled for a field goal. The second quarter opened with Texas's defense forcing a fumble which was recovered by Texas's Emmanuel Acho on the Texas 24-yard line. Texas was unable to capitalize and was forced to punt after reaching mid-field. Later in the 2nd quarter, after another Texas punt, Oklahoma punt returner Dominique Franks fumbled the ball, and it was recovered again by Texas, this time on the Oklahoma 18-yard line. The Oklahoma defense withstood the Texas offense, and Texas settled for a field goal to cut the lead in half, 6–3.

After halftime, Texas began with the ball and a 23-yard rush by Fozzy Whittaker. Texas progressed to and then stalled at the Oklahoma 25-yard line. After another field goal, the game was tied at six. After an Oklahoma three-and-out, Texas scored the first touchdown of the game on a drive that consisted of 12 plays, capped off with a 14-yard pass from McCoy to Marquise Goodwin. In the next possession, Oklahoma answered with an 18-yard pass from Jones to senior wide receiver Adron Tennell and a 35-yard pass to Broyles. The game was again tied at 13. Texas and Oklahoma both followed with three-and-outs. On Texas's last possession of the third quarter, which ran into the 4th quarter, they again progressed to the Oklahoma red zone but settled for a field goal to take the lead 16–13. In the 4th quarter, two consecutive Oklahoma drives ended with Jones throwing an interception. Oklahoma was unable to score and Texas ran down the clock for the win.

Oklahoma was never able to get a running game going and settled for negative 16 yards rushing while Texas had 142 yards. Oklahoma dominated the air game with 327 yards to Texas's 127. The game also saw many penalties on both sides of the ball. Oklahoma had 10 penalties for 125 yards and Texas had 11 for 103 yards. Texas won the turnover battle, forcing five Oklahoma turnovers while Oklahoma forced three. McCoy had one of the worst passing games of his career, while the Oklahoma defense only allowed four passes to Shipley for 22 yards. The game was watched by 8,713,000 television viewers and was the fifth most-viewed game during the 2009 regular season.

Kansas

Oklahoma traveled to Lawrence, Kansas for their first interdivision match against the Kansas Jayhawks. Kansas, coached by former Oklahoma assistant Mark Mangino, came into the game ranked 24 in the AP Poll and 25 in the Coaches Poll following a loss to Colorado the previous week. The Sooners won the previous matchup 45–31 in 2007 in which Sam Bradford threw for a school record 468 yards. Coming into the game, Oklahoma led the all-time series 68–27–6 and Bob Stoops was 5–0 against the Jayhawks.

Kansas began the game with the ball, but on the first play of the game, Oklahoma intercepted a pass from Kansas quarterback Todd Reesing. Oklahoma converted that turnover into a touchdown to take an early lead. The next Kansas possession ended the same way but Oklahoma was unable to convert again. At the end of the first quarter, Kansas was in the midst of a drive that had progressed to the Oklahoma 15-yard line. Starting the second quarter, Kansas gained an additional five yards to the 10-yard line. On the next play, Reesing threw a pass that was intercepted by Oklahoma's Dominique Franks who ran 85 yards for the touchdown and gave Oklahoma a 14–0 lead. Kansas was able to put points on the board late in the second quarter. With just over two minutes left in the half, Kansas kicker Jacob Branstetter kicked a 39-yard field goal. On the next Oklahoma possession, the Kansas defense intercepted a pass thrown by Landry Jones at the Oklahoma 40-yard line. Kansas was unable to move the ball forward and decided to attempt a 57-yard field goal with two seconds left. The successful attempt made the score 14–6 at halftime. The Oklahoma offense made more progress in the third quarter and  added two touchdowns. Oklahoma scored its last touchdown early in the fourth quarter to go up 35–6. Midway through the fourth quarter, Oklahoma running back Jermie Calhoun fumbled the ball and Kansas recovered at their own 45-yard line. Kansas was able to convert the turnover into a touchdown with 4:27 left on the clock. Oklahoma took possession of the ball and drained as much of the clock as possible before punting the ball to Kansas in time for them to run one last play.

Oklahoma quarterback Jones, starting after the re-injury of Bradford's shoulder, was 26-for-38 for 251 yards and two touchdowns. The Kansas offense, ranked number two in the country, was held to about 200 yards below its average. The day after the game, Sam Bradford announced he would have season-ending shoulder surgery and would enter April's NFL Draft.

Kansas State

Following the victory over Kansas, Oklahoma faced another team from the state. Kansas State, coached by Bob Stoops' mentor, Bill Snyder, traveled to Norman as the leader in the Big 12 North. The season before, Oklahoma tied a school record for most points in a half when they scored 55 points in the first half en route to winning 58–35. This year's game began similarly with Oklahoma scoring on their first three possessions on their way to a 21-point first quarter lead. All three touchdowns were passes from Landry Jones, two going to wide receiver Ryan Broyles and one to Dejuan Miller. Kansas State scored their first points early in the second quarter on a 2-yard rush from Keithen Valentine. Following a blocked extra point attempt, Oklahoma answered on their next possession to increase the lead to 28–6. The Wildcats managed a field goal before halftime to decrease the Sooner lead.

The second half saw the Wildcats surge — scoring a touchdown and a two-point conversion on their opening possession to cut the Sooner lead to 28–17. Following an Oklahoma four-and-out, Kansas State again scored but again had the extra point blocked. Oklahoma now led by only five points, 28–23. After not scoring during the third quarter, Oklahoma managed to score on the opening possession of the fourth quarter. On the ensuing kick off, Kansas State's Brandon Banks caught the ball at the 2-yard line and returned it for a touchdown to again cut the Sooner lead back to five. Oklahoma was able to score what would end up being the game sealing touchdown on the next possession to give them a 42–30 lead, which they held for the rest of the game.

Nebraska

The Sooners' next match was against Nebraska, a rivalry from the Big Eight days and before. The first match between the two teams took place in 1912. The 2009 match-up saw the two defenses dominate. The only touchdown of the game came when Nebraska took one of their five interceptions and returned it to the Oklahoma one-yard line. Their field goal came when another interception of freshman quarterback Landry Jones put them in field goal range. Jones would finish with five interceptions, an Oklahoma record. The Sooners' only points came on a field goal from Tress Way with less than a minute left in the first half. Way missed three other field goals in the game. The three points for the Sooners was the lowest under coach Bob Stoops. The Sooners fell to 5–4 after the loss, the worst record through nine games under Stoops to date. Oklahoma suffered additional injuries during the game. Guards Brody Eldridge and Jarvis Jones and defensive end Auston English all suffered season ending injuries in the game.

Texas A&M

Following the loss to Nebraska, Oklahoma returned home to play the Texas A&M Aggies, led by second-year head coach Mike Sherman. Entering the game, Bob Stoops was 9–1 against the Aggies. The game got off to a quick start for the Sooners. In the opening drive, Aggie running back Christine Michael fumbled the ball at the Oklahoma 47-yard line and it was picked up by Oklahoma's Brian Jackson and returned 52 yards for a touchdown. Later in the first quarter, WR Ryan Broyles rushed 25 yards for a second Sooner touchdown. A&M's next possession began on the 40-yard line and ended with a field goal. Following the kickoff, Landry Jones threw a pass that was tipped and intercepted by A&M's Michael Hodges, who returned it 28 yards to the Oklahoma 6-yard line. A&M converted that to a touchdown and narrowed the lead. At the end of the first quarter, Oklahoma led 14–10. It was the first time Oklahoma had allowed points in the first quarter in 12 games. Oklahoma began to run away with the game in the second quarter and scored on every offensive possession to go up 42–10 at halftime. Texas A&M was held scoreless after the first quarter while the Sooners added an additional 23 points in the second half. Oklahoma finished the game with 640 yards of total offense including 392 passing yards, a career-high for Jones. Oklahoma extended their NCAA-leading home winning streak to 29 straight games.

Texas Tech

For the final road game of the regular season, Oklahoma traveled to Lubbock, Texas where they had lost their previous two trips. Oklahoma had also struggled on the road during the season. They averaged nearly 50 points per game at home but just 17 points per game away from home. The game began with the Red Raiders scoring a field goal on their opening possession and Oklahoma responding on their second possession. The first quarter ended with a tie score of 3–3. Oklahoma increased their lead by three during the first possession of the second quarter. Texas Tech answered with a touchdown to go ahead 10–6. The next Texas Tech possession ended with another touchdown, which gave the Red Raiders a halftime lead of 17–6. The second half was dominated by Texas Tech. The Red Raiders were up 34–6 when Oklahoma scored again on a 51-yard touchdown pass to wide receiver Ryan Broyles. Texas Tech answered with their own touchdown to bring the score to 41–13. The 28-point margin of victory for the Red Raiders matched the second-worst loss by Oklahoma under Bob Stoops. The Oklahoma defense allowed 549 yards of total offense after not allowing more than 365 yards in any other game that season.

Oklahoma State (Bedlam Series)

    
    
    
    
    

The end of the regular season brought in-state rival Oklahoma State to Norman. This rivalry, referred to as the Bedlam Series, is the most lopsided series in the nation featuring two teams from the same state. Entering the game, Oklahoma led the series 80–15–7. At that time, Oklahoma State was one of only two teams that had defeated the Sooners at home under Bob Stoops. However, the Sooners came into the game with a six-game winning streak over the Cowboys. The Cowboys came into the game with hopes of a BCS berth, depending on a victory. Oklahoma State was ranked number 11 while the Sooners were unranked, which marked the third time a ranked Cowboys team played an unranked Sooners team, while the opposite scenario had occurred 38 times. Despite the ranking, Oklahoma was favored to win by eight points. In addition to the injuries Oklahoma had sustained throughout the season, Oklahoma State also came into the game missing a few of their key players. OSU wide receiver Dez Bryant was ruled ineligible by the NCAA in the weeks prior to the Bedlam game. Quarterback Zac Robinson missed the Cowboys' previous game due to a concussion.

The first quarter was plagued with fumbles by both teams. On the first offensive play following a 59-yard punt return by Ryan Broyles to the OSU 7-yard line, Oklahoma quarterback Landry Jones fumbled the ball, which was recovered by Oklahoma State. On OSU's first offensive play, running back Kendall Hunter fumbled the ball, but it was recovered by OSU. During an Oklahoma possession late in the first quarter, an incomplete pass to Dejuan Miller was ruled a fumble but was overturned following an instant replay analysis. Oklahoma State's next possession saw another fumble, this time by quarterback Robinson, but it was again recovered by the Cowboys. The first quarter ended scoreless with the only chance of points being a missed 35-yard field goal by Oklahoma kicker Patrick O'Hara. The second quarter opened with the continuation of a drive that began the previous quarter. Following another Oklahoma fumble that was recovered by the Sooners, Oklahoma settled for a 24-yard field goal to claim a 3–0 lead. On Oklahoma's next offensive possession, Jones connected with Broyles for a 47-yard completion to the OSU 13-yard line. The next play, DeMarco Murray rushed for the touchdown to give the Sooners a ten-point lead. Both teams were unable to put together a threatening drive for the remainder of the half.

Oklahoma opened the second half with a drive that lasted nearly seven minutes. Beginning at their own 20-yard line, the Sooners progressed to the Oklahoma State 2-yard line, but were forced to settle for a field goal to take a 13-point lead. Oklahoma State and then Oklahoma followed with quick three-and-outs. The next Cowboy possession began at the Oklahoma State 27-yard line. A pass from Robinson was intercepted by Jonathan Nelson and returned 37 yards to the OSU 13-yard line. DeMarco Murray scored a touchdown on a 12-yard rush two plays later. The third quarter ended with the Sooners up 20–0. Oklahoma's final score of the game came on an 87-yard punt return for a touchdown by Ryan Broyles halfway through the fourth quarter.

The recorded attendance for the game was 85,606, a Bedlam record, until it was broken in 2012 with a number of 85,824. The game also marked the 30th consecutive home victory, the longest in the country and a new record for the Sooners. The Cowboys came into the game averaging 400 yards per game in total offense (including a league-best 203 yards on the ground) but only managed 109 total yards (62 yards on the ground). Punter Tress Way also set a new school record by averaging 58.8 yards on his six punts. It also marked the first shutout in the series since 1993.

Stanford (Sun Bowl)

Rankings

Statistics

Team

Scores by quarter

Statistics from:

2010 NFL Draft

The 2010 NFL Draft was held on April 22–24, 2010 at Radio City Music Hall in New York City. The following Oklahoma players were either selected or signed as undrafted free agents following the draft. Sam Bradford was the first Sooner drafted #1 overall since Billy Sims in 1980.

References

External links
 

Oklahoma
Oklahoma Sooners football seasons
Sun Bowl champion seasons
Oklahoma Sooners football